As of 2012, Angola is a major magnet from surrounding border countries in Africa. The Angolan government has stepped it crackdown on illegal immigration with deportations.

References

Society of Angola
Angola
Angola